= Maria Jiray Falls =

Coordinates: 9°20′26″S 77°12′14″W

Maria Jiray
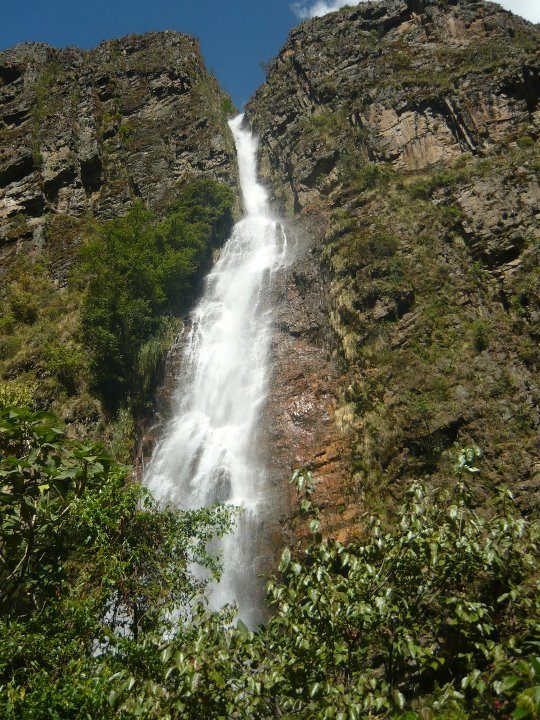
- Interactive map of Maria Jiray
- Location: Ancash Region, Peru
- Type: Tiered / Man-made
- Total height: 300 m (980 ft)

María Jiray is a man-made waterfall located at 3400 meters above sea level, near the town of Acopalca, in the Peruvian region of Ancash. It has an approximate height of 300 meters and is the byproduct of an aqueduct for a nearby hydroelectric plant, as water in excess is diverted to the creek where the waterfall is located. It is a local attraction for trekkers, along with remnants of Andean forests.
